Max Purcell and Luke Saville were the defending champions but chose not to defend their title.

Purav Raja and Ramkumar Ramanathan won the title after defeating Matthew Ebden and Leander Paes 6–0, 6–3 in the final.

Seeds

Draw

References

External links
 Main draw

Bengaluru Open - Doubles
2020 Doubles